Francis Michael Longstreth Thompson  (13 August 1925 – 23 August 2017) was an English economic and social historian. He wrote several books.

Early life
The son of Francis Longstreth Thompson, he was educated at Bootham School, York; The Queen's College, Oxford, where he took a first-class BA in 1949; and Merton College, Oxford, from 1949 to 1951, taking a DPhil in 1956.

Career
He was Reader in Economic History at University College London in 1963. He became Professor of Modern History at Bedford College in 1968, and was from 1977 to 1990 director of the Institute of Historical Research, University of London.

He was president of the Royal Historical Society from 1989 to 1993.

He was best known for English Landed Society in the Nineteenth Century (1963), which made the role of the landed gentry a high-priority topic for agrarian and political history. He also studied urban middle and working classes, and suburbia. He added to the long-standing debate on British class history by new emphasis on "respectability."  Thompson argued that it operated across  class boundaries and provided a powerful stabilizing counterbalance to the working class upheavals of Victorian society. His model of society contradicted the more commonly employed Marxist assumptions. He opened up a field that has attracted many younger scholars.

Personal life

In 1951 Thompson married Anne Challoner; they had two sons and a daughter.

Thompson died on 23 August 2017, aged 92.

Works
Victorian England: the horse-drawn society; an inaugural lecture (1970) at Bedford College
English Landed Society in the Nineteenth Century (1963)
The Rise of Suburbia (1982) editor
Horses in European Economic History: a preliminary canter (1983) editor
The Rise of Respectable Society: A Social History of Victorian Britain, 1830–1900 (1988)
The University of London and the World of Learning, 1836–1986 (1990)
The Cambridge Social History of Britain, 1750–1950 (1990, three volumes) editor
Gentrification and the Enterprise Culture: Britain 1780–1980 (1993) Ford Lectures
Landowners, Capitalists and Entrepreneurs (1994, editor)

References

Further reading
 Christine S. Hallas, "Thompson, F.M.L." in 
 N. B. Harte, ed. Land and Society in Britain, 1700–1914: Essays in Honour of F.M.L. Thompson (1996).

External links
Page at The Institute of Historical Research

1925 births
2017 deaths
British historians
People educated at Bootham School
Presidents of the Royal Historical Society
Commanders of the Order of the British Empire
Fellows of the British Academy
Alumni of Merton College, Oxford